Southwestern Oregon Community College is a public community college in Coos Bay, Oregon. It is Oregon's 2nd oldest community college, founded in 1961.

History
Founded in 1961, the college originally served Coos County and western Douglas County.  In 1995, Curry County joined the district.

Notable alumni

Doron Perkins - professional basketball player, 2009 Israeli Basketball Premier League MVP

See also 
 List of Oregon community colleges

References

Further reading
 - Shows the college's service area

External links

Official website

Community colleges in Oregon
Education in Curry County, Oregon
Coos Bay, Oregon
Universities and colleges accredited by the Northwest Commission on Colleges and Universities
Education in Coos County, Oregon
Education in Douglas County, Oregon
Buildings and structures in Coos County, Oregon
1961 establishments in Oregon